Tuzluca (Koghb;  or Тузлуджа) is a town and district of the Iğdır Province in the Eastern Anatolia region of Turkey. The northern portion of the district forms part of the international border between Turkey and Armenia.

Etymology 
Tuz means salt in the Turkish language.  The Turkish name Tuzluca is derived from the salt mines that have existed here since at least medieval times; a salt mine still operates.

History
Known by Armenians as Koghb, Tuzluca was historically part of various Armenian kingdoms.  The town and the surrounding area later became an Ottoman frontier Kurdish chiefdom and a scene of constant warfare between the Ottoman Empire and Persia. It was especially renowned for its salt mines.

In 1746, the region was finally ceded to Persia and became part of the Erivan Khanate. After the Russo-Persian War, 1826–1828 and Treaty of Turkmenchay, it passed from Persian to Russian control. Under Russian rule, the town, now known as Kulp, became part of the Surmali district of the Armenian Oblast and later the Erivan Governorate. In 1829, shortly after the Russian annexation, Baltic German explorer Friedrich Parrot of the University of Dorpat (Tartu) travelled to Surmali as part of his expedition to climb Mount Ararat. Two members of Parrot's expeditionary team, medical students Carl Schiemann and Maximilian Behaghel von Adlerskron, travelled to Kulp with four Cossacks to examine the salt mines.

After the Russian Revolution, the town came under the administration of the Democratic Republic of Armenia.  However, it was ceded to Turkey by the Soviet Union in the Treaty of Kars. It was traditionally part of Kars province until the creation of predominantly Iğdır province in 1993. Today, Tuzluca serves as a highland retreat for asthma patients. Apricots and other fruit and vegetables are grown in the district.

Government
In the local elections in March 2019 Ahmet Sair Sadrettin Türkan from the Felicity Party (SP) was elected mayor. Kaymakam is Abdullah Kadıoğlu.

Population
The town has a mixed population of Azerbaijanis and Kurds.

Notable people
 Eznik of Kolb, writer (5th century)
 Mehmet Hakkı Suçin, Arabist and translation scholar
 Servet Çetin, soccer player

References

External links 

  Official website of the Tuzluca Municipality
  Official website of the Tuzluca District
  Iğdır's News website

Populated places in Iğdır Province
Districts of Iğdır Province
Kurdish settlements in Turkey